Kurortne may refer to several places in Ukraine:

Kurortne, Bilohirsk Raion, Crimea, village in Bilohirsk Raion
Kurortne, Feodosia Municipality, Crimea, urban-type settlement in Feodosia Municipality
Kurortne, Lenine Raion, Crimea, village in Lenine Raion
Kurortne, Chuhuiv Raion, Kharkiv Oblast, village in Chuhuiv Raion
Kurortne, Kharkiv Raion, Kharkiv Oblast, village in Kharkiv Raion
Kurortne, Odessa Oblast, village in Bilhorod-Dnistrovskyi Raion